Walter Harvey Ballard Sr. (born January 12, 1933) is a former NASCAR driver from Houston, Texas. In 1971, he won the Rookie of the Year Award in the NASCAR Winston Cup Grand National Series (known as the NASCAR Cup Series as of 2021), in its first year under Winston's sponsorship.

NASCAR Winston Cup Series 
Ballard made his first start in the Winston Cup Series (then known as the Grand National Series) in 1966, but did not race in the series again until 1971.

In 1971, Ballard ran a nearly-full season in a car owned by his father Vic, capturing 11 top-tens, a tenth-place finish in points, and the Rookie of the Year Award.

In 1972, Ballard had an even better season, collecting 7 top-tens and a sixth-place finish in points. He continued to race full-time with his family-owned team until 1975, and competed part-time in the 1976 and 1977 seasons before retiring from the series after 1977.

Ballard's best result in the Winston Cup Series was a third-place finish in the 1971 Space City 300 at Meyer Speedway in Houston, Texas.

Other NASCAR series 
Ballard also drove six races in the NASCAR Grand National East Series from 1972–1973, collecting one top-ten in 1972, and attempted two races in the NASCAR Winston West Series in 1971 and 1976, failing to qualify for both.

Personal life 
In 1979, Ballard started an automotive repair business with his sons Daniel, Stoney and Clint, retiring in November 2005. As of 2007, he resides in Charlotte, North Carolina. His wife Katy died in 2019.

Motorsports Career Results

NASCAR
(key) (Bold – Pole position awarded by qualifying time. Italics – Pole position earned by points standings or practice time. * – Most laps led.)

Grand National Series

Winston Cup Series

References

External links
Stats from Racing-Reference.info

1933 births
Living people
NASCAR drivers
NASCAR team owners
Racing drivers from Houston
People from Foley, Alabama